Jericho is a Palestinian city in the West Bank. It is located in the Jordan Valley, with the Jordan River to the east and Jerusalem to the west. It is the administrative seat of the Jericho Governorate of the State of Palestine and is governed by the Palestinian National Authority as part of Area A. In 2007, it had a population of 18,346.

From the end of the era of Mandatory Palestine, the city was annexed and ruled by Jordan from 1949 to 1967 and, with the rest of the West Bank, has been subject to Israeli occupation since 1967; administrative control was handed over to the Palestinian Authority in 1994.

Jericho is claimed to be the oldest city in the world, and it is also the city with the oldest known protective wall. Archaeologists have unearthed the remains of more than 20 successive settlements in Jericho, the first of which dates back 11,000 years (to 9000 BCE), almost to the very beginning of the Holocene epoch of the Earth's history. Copious springs in and around the city have attracted human habitation for thousands of years. Jericho is described in the Bible as the "city of palm trees".

Etymology
Jericho's name in Hebrew, is generally thought to derive from the Canaanite word reaẖ ("fragrant"), but other theories hold that it originates in the Canaanite word for "moon" (Yareaẖ) or the name of the lunar deity Yarikh, for whom the city was an early centre of worship.

Jericho's Arabic name, means "fragrant" and also has its roots in Canaanite Reaẖ.

History and archaeology

The first excavations of the site were made by Charles Warren in 1868. Ernst Sellin and Carl Watzinger excavated Tell es-Sultan and Tulul Abu el-'Alayiq between 1907 and 1909, and in 1911, and John Garstang excavated between 1930 and 1936. Extensive investigations using more modern techniques were made by Kathleen Kenyon between 1952 and 1958. Lorenzo Nigro and Nicolò Marchetti conducted excavations in 1997–2000. Since 2009 the Italian-Palestinian archaeological project of excavation and restoration was resumed by Rome "La Sapienza" University and Palestinian MOTA-DACH under the direction of Lorenzo Nigro and Hamdan Taha, and Jehad Yasine since 2015. The Italian-Palestinian Expedition carried out 13 seasons in 20 years (1997–2017), with some major discoveries, like Tower A1 in the Middle Bronze Age southern Lower Town and Palace G on the eastern flanks of the Spring Hill overlooking the Spring of 'Ain es-Sultan dating from Early Bronze III.

Stone Age: Tell es-Sultan and spring
The earliest excavated settlement was located at the present-day Tell es-Sultan (or Sultan's Hill), a couple of kilometers from the current city. In both Arabic and Hebrew, tell means "mound" – consecutive layers of habitation built up a mound over time, as is common for ancient settlements in the Middle East and Anatolia. Jericho is the type site for the Pre-Pottery Neolithic A (PPNA) and Pre-Pottery Neolithic B (PPNB) periods.

Natufian hunter-gatherers,  10,000 BCE

Epipaleolithic construction at the site appears to predate the invention of agriculture, with the construction of Natufian culture structures beginning earlier than 9000 BCE, the beginning of the Holocene epoch in geologic history.

Jericho has evidence of settlement dating back to 10,000 BCE. During the Younger Dryas period of cold and drought, permanent habitation of any one location was impossible. However, the Ein es-Sultan spring at what would become Jericho was a popular camping ground for Natufian hunter-gatherer groups, who left a scattering of crescent-shaped microlith tools behind them. Around 9600 BCE, the droughts and cold of the Younger Dryas stadial had come to an end, making it possible for Natufian groups to extend the duration of their stay, eventually leading to year-round habitation and permanent settlement.

Pre-Pottery Neolithic,  9500–6500 BCE

The Pre-Pottery Neolithic at Jericho is divided in Pre-Pottery Neolithic A and Pre-Pottery Neolithic B.

Pre-Pottery Neolithic A (PPNA)

The first permanent settlement on the site of Jericho developed near the Ein es-Sultan spring between 9,500 and 9000 BCE. As the world warmed up, a new culture based on agriculture and sedentary dwelling emerged, which archaeologists have termed "Pre-Pottery Neolithic A" (abbreviated as PPNA). Its cultures lacked pottery, but featured the following:
 small circular dwellings
 burial of the dead under the floor of buildings
 reliance on hunting of wild game
 cultivation of wild or domestic cereals

At Jericho, circular dwellings were built of clay and straw bricks left to dry in the sun, which were plastered together with a mud mortar. Hearths were located within and outside the homes.

The Pre-Sultan (c. 8350 – 7370 BCE) is sometimes called Sultanian. This tower and the even older ones excavated at Tell Qaramel in Syria are the oldest towers ever to be discovered. The wall of Jericho may have served as a defence against flood-water, with the tower used for ceremonial purposes. The wall and tower were built during the Pre-Pottery Neolithic A (PPNA) period around 8000 BCE. For the tower, carbon dates published in 1981 and 1983 indicate that it was built around 8300 BCE and stayed in use until c. 7800 BCE. The wall and tower would have taken a hundred men more than a hundred days to construct, thus suggesting some kind of social organization. The town contained round mud-brick houses, yet no street planning. The identity and number of the inhabitants of Jericho during the PPNA period is still under debate, with estimates going as high as 2,000–3,000, and as low as 200–300. It is known that this population had domesticated emmer wheat, barley and pulses and hunted wild animals.

Pre-Pottery Neolithic B (PPNB)

The Pre-Pottery Neolithic B (PPNB) was a period of about 1.4 millennia, from 7220 to 5850 BCE (though carbon-14-dates are few and early). The following are PPNB cultural features:
 Expanded range of domesticated plants
 Possible domestication of sheep
 Apparent cult involving the preservation of human skulls, with facial features reconstructed using plaster, and eyes set with shells in some cases

After a few centuries, the first settlement was abandoned. After the PPNA settlement phase, there was a settlement hiatus of several centuries, then the PPNB settlement was founded on the eroded surface of the tell. This second settlement, established in 6800 BCE, perhaps represents the work of an invading people who absorbed the original inhabitants into their dominant culture. Artifacts dating from this period include ten plastered human skulls, painted so as to reconstitute the individuals' features. These represent either teraphim or the first example of portraiture in art history, and it is thought that they were kept in people's homes while the bodies were buried.

The architecture consisted of rectilinear buildings made of mudbricks on stone foundations. The mudbricks were loaf-shaped with deep thumb prints to facilitate bonding. No building has been excavated in its entirety. Normally, several rooms cluster around a central courtyard. There is one big room ( and ) with internal divisions; the rest are small, presumably used for storage. The rooms have red or pinkish terrazzo-floors made of lime. Some impressions of mats made of reeds or rushes have been preserved. The courtyards have clay floors.

Kathleen Kenyon interpreted one building as a shrine. It contained a niche in the wall. A chipped pillar of volcanic stone that was found nearby might have fitted into this niche.

The dead were buried under the floors or in the rubble fill of abandoned buildings. There are several collective burials. Not all the skeletons are completely articulated, which may point to a time of exposure before burial. A skull cache contained seven skulls. The jaws were removed and the faces covered with plaster; cowries were used as eyes. A total of ten skulls were found. Modelled skulls were found in Tell Ramad and Beisamoun as well.

Other finds included flints, such as arrowheads (tanged or side-notched), finely denticulated sickle-blades, burins, scrapers, a few tranchet axes, obsidian, and green obsidian from an unknown source. There were also querns, hammerstones, and a few ground-stone axes made of greenstone. Other items discovered included dishes and bowls carved from soft limestone, spindle whorls made of stone and possible loom weights, spatulae and drills, stylised anthropomorphic plaster figures, almost life-size, anthropomorphic and theriomorphic clay figurines, as well as shell and malachite beads.

In the late 4th millennium BCE, Jericho was occupied during Neolithic 2 and the general character of the remains on the site link it culturally with Neolithic 2 (or PPNB) sites in the West Syrian and Middle Euphrates groups. This link is established by the presence of rectilinear mud-brick buildings and plaster floors that are characteristic of the age.

Bronze Age

A succession of settlements followed from 4500 BCE onward.

Early Bronze Age
In the Early Bronze IIIA (c. 2700 – 2500/2450 BCE; Sultan IIIC1), the settlement reached its largest extent around 2600 BCE.

During Early Bronze IIIB (c. 2500/2450–2350 BCE; Sultan IIIC2) there was a Palace G on Spring Hill and city walls.

Middle Bronze Age

Jericho was continually occupied into the Middle Bronze Age; it was destroyed in the Late Bronze Age, after which it no longer served as an urban centre. The city was surrounded by extensive defensive walls strengthened with rectangular towers, and possessed an extensive cemetery with vertical shaft-tombs and underground burial chambers; the elaborate funeral offerings in some of these may reflect the emergence of local kings.

During the Middle Bronze Age, Jericho was a small prominent city of the Canaan region, reaching its greatest Bronze Age extent in the period from 1700 to 1550 BCE. It seems to have reflected the greater urbanization in the area at that time, and has been linked to the rise of the Maryannu, a class of chariot-using aristocrats linked to the rise of the Mitannite state to the north. Kathleen Kenyon reported "the Middle Bronze Age is perhaps the most prosperous in the whole history of Kna'an. ... The defenses ... belong to a fairly advanced date in that period" and there was "a massive stone revetment ... part of a complex system" of defenses. Bronze Age Jericho fell in the 16th century at the end of the Middle Bronze Age, the calibrated carbon remains from its City-IV destruction layer dating to 1617–1530 BCE. Carbon dating  1573 BCE confirmed the accuracy of the stratigraphical dating  1550.

Late Bronze Age
There was evidence of a small settlement in the Late Bronze Age ( 1400s BCE) on the site, but erosion and destruction from previous excavations have erased significant parts of this layer.

Iron Age
Tell es-Sultan remained unoccupied from the end of the 15th to the 10th–9th centuries BCE, when the city was rebuilt. Of this new city not much more remains than a four-room house on the eastern slope. By the 7th century, Jericho had become an extensive town, but this settlement was destroyed in the Babylonian conquest of Judah in the late 6th century.

Persian and Early Hellenistic periods
After the destruction of the Judahite city by the Babylonians in the late 6th century, whatever was rebuilt in the Persian period as part of the Restoration after the Babylonian captivity, left only very few remains. The tell was abandoned as a place of settlement not long after this period. During the Persian through Hellenistic periods, there is little in terms of occupation attested throughout the region.

Jericho went from being an administrative centre of Yehud Medinata ("the Province of Judah") under Persian rule to serving as the private estate of Alexander the Great between 336 and 323 BCE after his conquest of the region. In the middle of the 2nd century BCE Jericho was under Hellenistic rule of the Seleucid Empire, when the Syrian General Bacchides built a number of forts to strengthen the defences of the area around Jericho against the revolt by the Macabees. One of these forts, built at the entrance to Wadi Qelt, was later refortified by Herod the Great, who named it Kypros after his mother.

Hasmonean and Herodian periods
After the abandonment of the Tell es-Sultan location, the new Jericho of the Late Hellenistic or Hasmonean and Early Roman or Herodian periods was established as a garden city in the vicinity of the royal estate at Tulul Abu el-'Alayiq and expanded greatly thanks to the intensive exploitation of the springs of the area. The new site consists of a group of low mounds on both banks of Wadi Qelt. The Hasmoneans were a dynasty descending from a priestly group (kohanim) from the tribe of Levi, who ruled over Judea following the success of the Maccabean Revolt until Roman influence over the region brought Herod to claim the Hasmonean throne.

The rock-cut tombs of a Herodian- and Hasmonean-era cemetery lie in the lowest part of the cliffs between Nuseib al-Aweishireh and Mount of Temptation. They date between 100 BCE and 68 CE.

Herodian period

Herod had to lease back the royal estate at Jericho from Cleopatra, after Mark Antony had given it to her as a gift. After their joint suicide in 30 BCE, Octavian assumed control of the Roman Empire and granted Herod absolute rule over Jericho, as part of the new Herodian domain. Herod's rule oversaw the construction of a hippodrome-theatre (Tell es-Samrat) to entertain his guests and new aqueducts to irrigate the area below the cliffs and reach his winter palaces built at the site of Tulul Abu el-Alaiq (also written Alayiq). In 2008 the Israel Exploration Society published an illustrated volume of Herod's third Jericho palace.

The murder of Aristobulus III in a swimming pool at the Jericho royal winter palaces, as described by the Roman Jewish historian Josephus, took place during a banquet organized by Herod's Hasmonean mother-in-law. After the construction of the palaces, the city had functioned not only as an agricultural center and as a crossroad, but also as a winter resort for Jerusalem's aristocracy.

Herod was succeeded in Judea by his son, Herod Archelaus, who built a village in his name not far to the north, Archelaïs (modern Khirbet al-Beiyudat), to house workers for his date plantation.

First-century Jericho is described in Strabo's Geography as follows:

In the New Testament

The Christian Gospels state that Jesus of Nazareth passed through Jericho where he healed blind beggars, and inspired a local chief tax-collector named Zacchaeus to repent of his dishonest practices. The road between Jerusalem and Jericho is the setting for the Parable of the Good Samaritan.

John Wesley, in his New Testament Notes on this section of Luke's Gospel, claimed that "about twelve thousand priests and Levites dwelt there, who all attended the service of the temple".

Smith's Bible Names Dictionary suggests that on the arrival of Jesus and his entourage, "Jericho was once more 'a city of palms' when our Lord visited it. Here he restored sight to the blind (Matthew 20:30; Mark 10:46; Luke 18:35). Here the descendant of Rahab did not disdain the hospitality of Zaccaeus the publican. Finally, between Jerusalem and Jericho was laid the scene of his story of the good Samaritan."

Roman province
After the fall of Jerusalem to Vespasian's armies in the Great Revolt of Judea in 70 CE, Jericho declined rapidly, and by 100 CE it was but a small Roman garrison town. A fort was built there in 130 and played a role in putting down the Bar Kochba revolt in 133.

Byzantine period

Accounts of Jericho by a Christian pilgrim are given in 333. Shortly thereafter the built-up area of the town was abandoned and a Byzantine Jericho, Ericha, was built 1600 metres (1 mi) to the east, on which the modern town is centered. Christianity took hold in the city during the Byzantine era and the area was heavily populated. A number of monasteries and churches were built, including St George of Koziba in 340 CE and a domed church dedicated to Saint Eliseus. At least two synagogues were also built in the 6th century CE. The monasteries were abandoned after the Persian invasion of 614.

The Jericho synagogue in the Royal Maccabean winter palace at Jericho dates from 70 to 50 BCE. A synagogue dating to the late 6th or early 7th century CE was discovered in Jericho in 1936, and was named Shalom Al Yisrael Synagogue, or "peace unto Israel", after the central Hebrew motto in its mosaic floor. It was controlled by Israel after the Six Day War, but after the handover to Palestinian Authority control per the Oslo Accords, it has been a source of conflict. On the night of 12 October 2000, the synagogue was vandalized by Palestinians who burned holy books and relics and damaged the mosaic.

The Na'aran synagogue, another Byzantine era construction, was discovered on the northern outskirts of Jericho in 1918. While less is known of it than Shalom Al Yisrael, it has a larger mosaic and is in similar condition.

Early Muslim period

Jericho, by then named "Ariha" in Arabic variation, became part of Jund Filastin ("Military District of Palestine"), part of the larger province of Bilad al-Sham. The Arab Muslim historian Musa b. 'Uqba (died 758) recorded that caliph Umar ibn al-Khattab exiled the Jews and Christians of Khaybar to Jericho (and Tayma).

By 659, that district had come under the control of Mu'awiya, founder of the Umayyad dynasty. That year, an earthquake destroyed Jericho. A decade later, the pilgrim Arculf visited Jericho and found it in ruins, all its "miserable Canaanite" inhabitants now dispersed in shanty towns around the Dead Sea shore.

A palatial complex long attributed to the tenth Umayyad caliph, Hisham ibn Abd al-Malik (r. 724–743) and thus known as Hisham's Palace, is located at Khirbet al-Mafjar, about 1.5 kilometres (1 mi) north of Tell es-Sultan. This "desert castle" or qasr was more likely built by Caliph Walid ibn Yazid (r. 743–744), who was assassinated before he could complete the construction. The remains of two mosques, a courtyard, mosaics, and other items can still be seen in situ today. The unfinished structure was largely destroyed in an earthquake in 747.

Umayyad rule ended in 750 and was followed by the Arab caliphates of the Abbasid and Fatimid dynasties. Irrigated agriculture was developed under Islamic rule, reaffirming Jericho's reputation as a fertile "City of the Palms". Al-Maqdisi, the Arab geographer, wrote in 985 that "the water of Jericho is held to be the highest and best in all Islam. Bananas are plentiful, also dates and flowers of fragrant odor". Jericho is also referred to by him as one of the principal cities of Jund Filastin.

Crusader period
In 1179, the Crusaders rebuilt the Monastery of St. George of Koziba, at its original site 10 kilometres (6 mi) from the center of town. They also built another two churches and a monastery dedicated to John the Baptist, and are credited with introducing sugarcane production to the city. The site of Tawahin es-Sukkar (lit. "sugar mills") holds remains of a Crusader sugar production facility. In 1187, the Crusaders were evicted by the Ayyubid forces of Saladin after their victory in the Battle of Hattin, and the town slowly went into decline.

Ayyubid and Mamluk periods

In 1226, Arab geographer Yaqut al-Hamawi said of Jericho, "it has many palm trees, also sugarcane in quantities, and bananas. The best of all the sugar in the Ghaur land is made here." In the 14th century, Abu al-Fida writes there are sulfur mines in Jericho, "the only ones in Palestine".

Ottoman period

16th century
Jericho was incorporated into the Ottoman Empire in 1517 with all of Palestine, and in 1545 a revenue of 19,000 Akçe was recorded, destined for the new Waqf for the Haseki Sultan Imaret of Jerusalem. The villagers processed indigo as one source of revenue, using a cauldron specifically for this purpose that was loaned to them by the Ottoman authorities in Jerusalem. Later that century, the Jericho revenues no longer went to the Haseki Sultan Imaret.

In 1596 Jericho appeared in the tax registers under the name of Riha, being in the nahiya of Al-Quds in the liwa of Al-Quds. It had a population of 51 household, all Muslims. They paid a fixed tax-rate of 33.3% on agricultural products, including wheat, barley, summer crops, vineyards and fruit trees, goats and beehives, water buffaloes, in addition to occasional revenues; a total of 40,000 Akçe. All of the revenue still went to a Waqf.

17th century
The French traveller Laurent d'Arvieux described the city in 1659 as "now desolate, and consists only of about fifty poor houses, in bad condition ... The plain around is extremely fertile; the soil is middling fat; but it is watered by several rivulets, which flow into the Jordan. Notwithstanding these advantages only the gardens adjacent to the town are cultivated."

19th century

In the 19th century, European scholars, archaeologists and missionaries visited often. At the time it was an oasis in a poor state, similar to other regions in the plains and deserts. Edward Robinson (1838) reported 50 families, which were about 200 people, Titus Tobler (1854) reported some 30 poor huts, whose residents paid a total of 3611 kuruş in tax. Abraham Samuel Herschberg (1858–1943) also reported after his 1899–1900 travels in the region of some 30 poor huts and 300 residents. At that time, Jericho was the residence of the region's Turkish governor. The main water sources for the village were a spring called Ein al-Sultan, lit. "Sultan's Spring", in Arabic and Ein Elisha, lit. "Elisha Spring", in Hebrew, and springs in Wadi Qelt.

J. S. Buckingham (1786–1855) describes in his 1822 book how the male villagers of er-Riha, although nominally sedentary, engaged in Bedouin-style raiding, or ghazzu: the little land cultivation he observed was done by women and children, while men spent most of their time riding through the plains and engaging in "robbery and plunder", their main and most profitable activity.

An Ottoman village list from around 1870 showed that Riha, Jericho, had 36 houses and a population of 105, though the population count included men only.Hartmann, 1883, p. 124, noted 34 houses

The first excavation at Tell es-Sultan was carried out in 1867.

20th century

The Greek Orthodox monasteries of St. George of Choziba and John the Baptist were refounded and completed in 1901 and 1904, respectively.

British Mandate period

After the collapse of the Ottoman Empire at the end of World War I, Jericho came under British rule, as part of Mandatory Palestine.

According to the 1922 census of Palestine, Jericho had 1,029 inhabitants, consisting of 931 Muslims, 6 Jews and 92 Christians; where the Christians were 45 Orthodox, 12 Roman Catholics, 13 Greek Catholics (Melkite Catholics), 6 Syrian Catholic, 11 Armenians, 4 Copts and 1 Church of England.

In 1927, an earthquake struck and affected Jericho and other cities. Around 300 people died, but by the 1931 census the population had increased to 1,693 inhabitants, in 347 houses.

In the 1945 statistics, the Jericho's population was 3,010; 2,570 Muslims, 170 Jews, 260 Christians and 10 classified as "other", and it had jurisdiction over 37,481 dunams of land. Of this, 948 dunams were used for citrus and bananas, 5,873 dunams were for plantations and irrigable land, 9,141 for cereals, while a total of 38 dunams were urban, built-up areas.

During World War II The British built fortresses in Jericho with the help of the Jewish company Solel Boneh, and bridges were rigged with explosives in preparation for a possible invasion by German allied forces.

Jordanian period
Jericho came under Jordanian control after the 1948 Arab–Israeli War. The Jericho Conference, organized by King Abdullah and attended by over 2,000 Palestinian delegates in 1948 proclaimed "His Majesty Abdullah as King of all Palestine" and called for "the unification of Palestine and Transjordan as a step toward full Arab unity". In mid-1950, Jordan formally annexed the West Bank and Jericho residents, like other residents of West Bank localities became Jordanian citizens.

In 1961, the population of Jericho was 10,166, of whom 935 were Christian, and the rest were Muslim.

1967 and aftermath

Jericho has been occupied by Israel since the Six-Day War of 1967 along with the rest of the West Bank. It was the first city handed over to Palestinian Authority control in accordance with the Oslo Accords. The limited Palestinian self-rule of Jericho was agreed on in the Gaza–Jericho Agreement of 4 May 1994. Part of the agreement was a "Protocol on Economic Relations", signed on 29 April 1994. The city is in an enclave of the Jordan Valley that is in Area A of the West Bank, while the surrounding area is designated as being in Area C under full Israeli military control. Four roadblocks encircle the enclave, restricting Jericho's Palestinian population's movement through the West Bank.

In response to the 2001 Second Intifada and suicide bombings, Jericho was re-occupied by Israeli troops.

On 14 March 2006, the Israel Defense Forces launched Operation Bringing Home the Goods, raiding a Jericho prison to capture the PFLP general secretary, Ahmad Sa'adat, and five other prisoners, all of whom had been charged with assassinating the Israeli tourist minister Rehavam Zeevi in 2001.

After Hamas assaulted a neighborhood in Gaza mostly populated by the Fatah-aligned Hilles clan, in response to their attack that killed six Hamas members, the Hilles clan was relocated to Jericho on 4 August 2008.

In 2009, Palestinian Authority Prime Minister Salam Fayyad and U.S. Assistant Secretary of State for International Narcotics and Law Enforcement Affairs David Johnson inaugurated the Presidential Guard Training Center in Jericho, a $9.1 million training facility for Palestinian Authority security forces built with U.S. funding.

Geography and environment

Important Bird Area
A  site encompassing the city of Jericho and its immediate surrounds has been recognised as an Important Bird Area (IBA) by BirdLife International because it supports populations of black francolins, lanner falcons, lesser kestrels and Dead Sea sparrows.

Climate
According to the Köppen climate classification, Jericho has a hot desert climate (BWh). Rich alluvial soil and abundant spring water have made Jericho an attractive place for settlement.

Demographics

In the first census carried out by the Palestinian Central Bureau of Statistics (PCBS), in 1997, Jericho's population was 14,674. Palestinian refugees constituted a significant 43.6% of the residents or 6,393 people. The gender make-up of the city was 51% male and 49% female. Jericho has a young population, with nearly half (49.2%) of the inhabitants being under the age of 20. People between the ages of 20 and 44 made up 36.2% of the population, 10.7% between the ages of 45 and 64, and 3.6% were over the age of 64. In the 2007 census by the PCBS, Jericho had a population of 18,346.

Demographics have varied widely depending on the dominant ethnic group and rule in the region over the past three thousand years. In a 1945 land and population survey by Sami Hadawi, 3,010 inhabitants is the figure given for Jericho, of which 94% (2840) were Arab and 6% (170) were Jews. Today, the overwhelming majority of the population is Muslim. The Christian community makes up around 1% of the population. A large community of black Palestinians is present in Jericho.

Economy

In 1994, Israel and the Palestinians signed an economic accord that enabled Palestinians in Jericho to open banks, collect taxes and engage in export and import in preparation for self-rule.
Agriculture is another source of income, with banana groves ringing the city.

The Jericho Agro-Industrial Park is a public-private enterprise being developed in the Jericho area. Agricultural processing companies are being offered financial concessions to lease plots of land in the park in a bid to boost Jericho's economy.

Tourism

In 1998, a $150 million casino-hotel was built in Jericho with the backing of Yasser Arafat. The casino is now closed, though the hotel on the premises is open for guests.

In 2010, Jericho, with its proximity to the Dead Sea, was declared the most popular destination among Palestinian tourists.

Biblical and Christian landmarks
Christian tourism is one of Jericho's primary sources of income. There are several major Christian pilgrimage sites in and around Jericho.
 Ein as-Sultan, known as the Spring of Elisha to Jews and Christians;
 Qasr al-Yahud on the Jordan River, across from Bethany beyond the Jordan, traditionally identified as the location of the baptism of Jesus;
 Mount of Temptation (Jebel Quruntul), traditionally identified as the location of the Temptation of Jesus;
 The Greek Orthodox Monastery of the Temptation halfway up the mountain, beside a cave said to be the location where Jesus fasted for 40 days and connected to Jericho by a cable car;
 2 sycamore trees separately mentioned as the one mentioned in relation to Zacchaeus;
 Deir Hajla, the monastery of St. Gerasimos in the Jordan Valley near Jericho;
 Saint George Monastery in Wadi Qelt above Jericho.

Archaeological landmarks
 Stone, Bronze and Iron Age cities at Tell es-Sultan;
 Hasmonean and Herodian winter palaces at Tulul Abu el-'Alayiq;
 Byzantine-period synagogues at Jericho (Shalom Al Yisrael Synagogue) and Na'aran;
 Umayyad palace at Khirbet al-Mafjar known as Hisham's Palace;
 Crusader sugar production facility at Tawahin es-Sukkar (lit. "sugar mills");
 Nabi Musa, the Mamluk and Ottoman shrine claimed to be the resting place of Moses ("Prophet Musa" to the Muslims)

Schools and religious institutions
In 1925, Christian friars opened a school for 100 pupils that became the Terra Santa School. The city has 22 state schools and a number of private schools.

Health care
In April 2010, the United States Agency for International Development (USAID) held a groundbreaking ceremony for the renovation of the Jericho Governmental Hospital. USAID is providing $2.5 million in funding for this project.

Sports
The sports team Hilal Areeha plays association football in the West Bank First Division. They play home games in the 15,000-spectator Jericho International Stadium.

Twin towns – sister cities

Jericho is twinned with:

 Alessandria, Italy (2004)
 Campinas, Brazil (2001)
 Eger, Hungary (2013)
 Estación Central, Chile (2007)
 Fez, Morocco (2014)
 Foz do Iguaçu, Brazil (2012)
 Iași, Romania (2003)
 Ilion, Greece (1999)
 Kragujevac, Serbia (2011)
 Lærdal, Norway (1998)
 Pisa, Italy (2000)
 San Giovanni Valdarno, Italy (2004)
 Santa Bárbara, Brazil (1998)
 Al-Shuna al-Shamalyah, Jordan (2016)

Notable people
 Musa Alami

See also

al-Auja, Jericho, a Palestinian village north of Jericho
Battle of Jericho, biblical story
Cities in the Book of Joshua
Hasmonean royal winter palaces, actually Hasmonean and Herodian, at Tulul Abu al-'Alayiq south of Jericho proper
History of pottery in Palestine
Jawa, Jordan, the oldest proto-urban settlement from Jordan (late 4th millennium BC – Early Bronze Age)
Mevo'ot Yericho, Israeli settlement just north of Jericho
Tower of Jericho, the Neolithic stone tower, c. 10,000 years old, excavated at Tell es-Sultan
Wall of Jericho, the Neolithic stone wall, c. 10,000 years old, excavated at Tell es-Sultan

 Citations 

 General and cited references 

 
 
 
  pp. 173, 174, 181, 183, 231, 507;
 
 
 
 
 
 
 
 
  (p. 46 ff)
 
 
 
 
 
 
 
 
 
 
 
 
 
 
 
 
 
 
 
 
  
 
 Stacey, D. 'Hedonists or pragmatic agriculturalists? Reassessing Hasmonean Jericho', Levant'', 38''' (2006), 191–202.

External links

 Welcome to Jericho
 Jericho City (Fact Sheet), Applied Research Institute–Jerusalem, Applied Research Institute–Jerusalem (ARIJ)
 Jericho City Profile, ARIJ
 Jericho aerial photo, ARIJ
 Locality Development Priorities and Needs in Jericho City, ARIJ
 Jericho Municipality Official Website
 Survey of Western Palestine, Map 18: IAA, Wikimedia commons
 Jericho Municipality Official Website Historical site
 Jericho Cable Car
 Resources on Biblical Archaeology
 Jericho: Tel es-Sultan 
 The walls of Jericho fell in 1550 BCE

 
Archaeological type sites
Archaeology of Palestine (region)
Bronze Age sites in the State of Palestine
Cities in the Great Rift Valley
Cities in the West Bank
Hebrew Bible cities
Historic Jewish communities
Important Bird Areas of the State of Palestine
Municipalities of the State of Palestine
Natufian sites
Neolithic settlements
Neolithic
Pre-Pottery Neolithic A
Prehistoric art
Palestinian Christian communities
Tegart forts
Tells (archaeology)
Torah cities
Populated places established in the 10th millennium BC